Johnny Power (10 April 1874 – 16 May 1958) was an Australian rules footballer who played for the Fitzroy Football Club in the Victorian Football League (VFL).

Although Power only made 10 senior appearances for Fitzroy, he was a premiership player. In his seventh game he played as a full-back in their 1898 premiership team.

References

External links

 

1874 births
1958 deaths
Fitzroy Football Club players
Fitzroy Football Club Premiership players
Australian rules footballers from Bendigo
One-time VFL/AFL Premiership players